Nataša Osmokrović, born 27 May 1976 in Zagreb, Yugoslavia) is an international Croatian volleyball player who played with Croatia at the 2000 Summer Olympics.

Personal life
Natasa has a son named Markus and currently lives in Moscow.

Career
Osmokrović, then Nataša Leto, played with her national team in the 2000 Summer Olympics, helping them to reach the quarterfinals rounds and finishing in seventh place. She won the bronze medal at the 2007–08 CEV Indesit Champions League with Asystel Novara and also was individually awarded "Best Receiver". She also won the 2009 CEV Cup with Novara. She signed a two-year contract with the Turkish team Fenerbahçe Acibadem in 2009. With this team she was awarded "Best Server" at the CEV Indesit Champions League Final Four 2010 and win the Turkish League Championship. She also won the 2010 Clubs World Championship crown and the bronze medal in the 2011 CEV Championsleague with Fenerbahçe.

Osmokrović win the 2011 FIVB Women's Club World Championship playing in Doha, Qatar with Rabita Baku. She were also named Most Valuable Player, Best Scorer, Best Spiker and Best Receiver.

Clubs
  Mladost Zagreb (1995–1996)
  Hisamitsu Springs  (1996–1997)
  Ito Yokado  (1997–1998)
  BCN/Osasco (1998–1999)
  Er Volley Napoli (1999–2000)
  Vasco da Gama (2000–2001)
  Caffè Sesso Reggio Calabria (2001–2002)
  Asystel Novara (2001–2002)
  Pallavolo Chieri (2003–2004)
  Terra Sarda Tortolì (2004–2005)
  Sant'Orsola Asystel Novara (2005–2007)
  Asystel Novara (2007–2009)
  Fenerbahçe Acıbadem (2009–2011)
  Rabita Baku (2011–2012)
  WVC Dynamo Moscow (2012–2013)
  Volero Zurich (2013–2014)

Awards

Individuals
 2007–08 CEV Indesit Champions League Final Four "Best Receiver"
 2009–10 CEV Indesit Champions League Final Four "Best Server"
 2011 FIVB Women's Club World Championship "Most Valuable Player"
 2011 FIVB Women's Club World Championship "Best Scorer"
 2011 FIVB Women's Club World Championship "Best Spiker"
 2011 FIVB Women's Club World Championship "Best Receiver"

Clubs
 2001 Brazilian Superliga: Runner-Up, with Vasco da Gama
 2005 Italian Super Cup -  Champion, with Sant'Orsola Asystel Novara
 2006 Top Teams Cup -  Champion, with Sant'Orsola Asystel Novara
 2007 Italian Cup -  Champion, with Asystel Novara
 2009 CEV Cup -  Champion, with Asystel Novara
 2010 Women's CEV Champions League -  Runner-Up, with Fenerbahçe Acıbadem
 2009-10 Turkish Championship -  Champion, with Fenerbahçe Acıbadem
 2009-10 Turkish Cup -  Champion, with Fenerbahçe Acıbadem
 2010 Turkish Super Cup -  Champion, with Fenerbahçe Acıbadem
 2010 FIVB World Club Championship -  Champion, with Fenerbahçe Acıbadem
 2010-11 CEV Champions League -  Bronze medal, with Fenerbahçe Acıbadem
 2010-11 Aroma Women's Volleyball League -  Champion, with Fenerbahçe Acıbadem
 2011 FIVB Women's Club World Championship -  Champion, with Rabita Baku
 2011-12 Azerbaijan League -  Champion, with Rabita Baku

References

External links

 Italian League Profile
 Player profile at fenerbahce.org

1976 births
Living people
Croatian women's volleyball players
Fenerbahçe volleyballers
Croatian expatriate sportspeople in Turkey
Croatian expatriate sportspeople in Japan
Volleyball players at the 2000 Summer Olympics
Olympic volleyball players of Croatia
Outside hitters
Expatriate volleyball players in Japan
Expatriate volleyball players in Brazil
Expatriate volleyball players in Italy
Expatriate volleyball players in Turkey
Expatriate volleyball players in Azerbaijan
Expatriate volleyball players in Russia
Expatriate volleyball players in Switzerland
Croatian expatriate volleyball players
Croatian expatriate sportspeople in Italy
Croatian expatriate sportspeople in Azerbaijan
Croatian expatriate sportspeople in Russia
Croatian expatriate sportspeople in Switzerland